William H. Twine (1864 - 1933) was an American lawyer and newspaper publisher in Oklahoma. He published the Muskogee Cimeter in Muskogee, Oklahoma.

He was born in Richmond, Kentucky. He moved to Texas where he was admitted to the bar and then settled a homestead in Oklahoma. He defended African American clients and reportedly slept at the jail on occasion to help deter lynchings. Henry Twine and Pliny Twine were his sons.

Taft, Oklahoma was originally named Twine after him.

References

1864 births
1933 deaths
19th-century American women lawyers
19th-century American lawyers
20th-century American lawyers
American civil rights lawyers
19th-century American newspaper publishers (people)
20th-century American newspaper founders
People from Richmond, Kentucky
Oklahoma lawyers
African-American lawyers
African-American journalists
Black Native American people
19th-century Native Americans
20th-century Native Americans
Native American people from Kentucky
Native American people from Oklahoma
Native American activists
African-American activists
Native American lawyers
Native American journalists
People from Xenia, Ohio
African-American educators
People from Chandler, Oklahoma
Oklahoma Republicans